Sally Gall (born 1956) is an American photographer. 

Her work is included in the collections of the  Whitney Museum of American Art, the RISD Museum, the Tufts University Art Galleries, the Museum of Fine Arts Houston, the Brooklyn Museum, and the Bates Museum of Art.

References

Living people
1956 births
20th-century American photographers
21st-century American photographers
20th-century American women artists
21st-century American women artists